Peter Bowles (16 October 1936 – 17 March 2022) was an English television and stage actor. He gained prominence for television dramas such as Callan: A Magnum for Schneider and I, Claudius. He is however, best remembered for his roles in sitcoms and television dramadies, including: Rumpole of the Bailey, Only When I Laugh, To the Manor Born, The Bounder, The Irish R.M., Lytton's Diary, Executive Stress and Perfect Scoundrels.

Early life and education
Bowles was born in London, England.  His father, Herbert Reginald Bowles, was a valet-companion and chauffeur to Drogo Montagu, son of the George Montagu, 9th Earl of Sandwich, and later butler to Montagu’s widow, a daughter of Lord Beaverbrook. His mother, Sarah Jane (née Harrison), was from Scotland, and served as a nanny to the family of the Duke of Argyll, before working for Beaverbrook's family in England, which is how they met. In October 1939, the family lived in Brackley, Northamptonshire, moving to Nottingham a few months later. In Nottingham, they lived in the working-class area of Hyson Green. He attended Berridge Road Juniors and High Pavement Grammar School.

Personal life and death 
Bowles married Susan Bennett on 8 April 1961. The couple lived in Barnes, south-west London and had three children together. He died on 17 March 2022, aged 85, from cancer.

Filmography

Film

Television

Awards and honours 

 RADA Scholarship (1954)
 Madge Kendal Prize (1955)
 Male Comedy Star Award (1983)
 ITV Personality of the Year (1984)
 The Golden Gate Award (San Francisco International Film Festival, 1993)
 Hon. Doctor of Literature, for contributions to the theatre, television drama and entertainment. (Nottingham Trent University, 2002)

Books
 Autobiography: Ask Me if I'm Happy (Simon & Schuster, 2010)
 Behind the Curtain: The Job of Acting (Oberon Masters Series, 2012)

References

External links

 Selected roles in Bristol University Theatre Archive
 

1936 births
2022 deaths

20th-century English male actors
21st-century English male actors

Alumni of RADA
Deaths from cancer in England

English male stage actors
English male television actors
English people of Scottish descent
Male actors from London
People educated at Nottingham High Pavement Grammar School